Ktav Ashuri ("Assyrian script"; also Ashurit) is the traditional Hebrew language name of the Hebrew alphabet, used to write both Hebrew and Jewish Babylonian Aramaic.  It is also sometimes called the "square script", the term is used to distinguish the Ashuri script from the Paleo-Hebrew script.

In halakha, tefillin (phylacteries) and mezuzot (door-post scripts) can only be written in Ashurit.

Name 

Ktav Ashuri is the term used in the Talmud; the modern Hebrew term for the Hebrew alphabet is simply  "Hebrew alphabet". Consequently, the term Ktav Ashuri refers primarily to a traditional calligraphic form of the alphabet used in writing the Torah. However, the term Ashuri is often used in the Babylonian Talmud to refer to the contemporary "Hebrew alphabet", as opposed to the older Paleo-Hebrew script.

The Talmud gives two opinions for why the script is called Ashuri:
 either because the Jews brought it back with them when they returned from exile in Assyria (called Ashur in Hebrew);
 alternatively, this script was given at Mount Sinai and then forgotten and eventually revived, and received its name because it is "me'usheret" (beautiful/praiseworthy or authorized).

The name reflects the fact that the Hebrew alphabet used by Jews (as opposed to the Ancient Israelites, or Samaritans) was derived from the Aramaic alphabet, it thus refers to "the Aramaic alphabet as used in Judaism", and is sometimes referred to as the "Assyrian script."

The name contrasts with the name Libonaa (or Liboni) given to the Samaritan alphabet, and by extension the Paleo-Hebrew alphabet. This name is most likely derived from Lubban, i.e. the script is called "Libanian" (of Lebanon), although it has also been suggested that the name is a corrupted form of "Neapolitan", i.e. of Nablus.

History 

Mention of the Ashuri script first appears in rabbinic writings of the Mishnaic and Talmudic periods, referring to the formal script used in certain Jewish ceremonial items, such as sifrei Torah, tefillin, mezuzot, and the Five Megillot.

According to the Talmud, Ezra was the first to mandate that the sefer Torah be written in the Assyrian alphabet rather than in the Paleo-Hebrew alphabet used formerly and permitted that the Book of Daniel be composed in Aramaic. According to the Talmud, prior to Ezra the Torah had been written in Paleo-Hebrew (Ktav Ivri), and Ezra switched it to Ktav Ashuri. However, there is a dispute (in the Talmud) as to whether it was originally written in Ktav Ashuri but switched to Paleo-Hebrew, and Ezra was switching it back to the original Ktav Ashuri; or that it was originally in written Paleo-Hebrew script and Ezra was the first to change it to Ktav Ashuri. According to a third opinion, the Torah had always been written in Ktav Ashuri. The Samaritans continue to write their Samaritan Torah in Ktav Ivri, now commonly called the Samaritan script.

See also
 Ktav Stam

References

Assyrian (Ashuri) script
Hebrew calligraphy
Language and mysticism